The Grand Prix de l'UVF was a track cycling sprint race held annually from 1894 until 1945. During this time, it was the most important competition for track sprinters alongside the UCI Track Cycling World Championships and the Grand Prix de Paris.

Winners

References

Cycle races in France
Defunct cycling races in France
Recurring sporting events established in 1894
1894 establishments in France
Recurring sporting events disestablished in 1945
Track cycling races
1945 disestablishments in France